Nolinae is a subfamily of the moth family Nolidae. The subfamily was erected by Charles Théophile Bruand d'Uzelle in 1846. They resemble some Arctiidae in appearance.

Genera

Former genera
 Melaleucia – transferred to Erebidae

References

External links